Konstantin Tolokonnikov (born 26 February 1996 in Rostov-on-Don, Russia) is a Russian middle distance runner who has specializes in the 800 metres. Tolokonnikov has won silver medals at the 2013 World Youth Championships and at the 2015 European Junior Championships. At the 2015 European Junior Championships Tolokonnikov won the gold medal in the 4 × 400 metres relay.

At the 2013 World Youth Championships Tolokonnikov made up a huge amount of ground to pass five men in the last 100 m which is partly why he has earned the nickname “the second Borzakovskiy”, after the Russian Olympic 2004 champion Yuriy Borzakovskiy. Tolokonnikov run with very similar style also at the 2015 European Team Championships Super League and at the 2015 European Junior Championships and because of that he is becoming well known for sitting back until about the last 100 metres and then using a great kick to catch up and win a medal, reminiscent of the tactics of the great Borzakovskiy.

In August 2015 Tolokonnikov won his first Russian national Championships gold with a personal best of 1:45.76. In this race Tolokonnikov didn't sit back but lead the race from start to finish. His time qualified him to the 2015 World Championships. A few days later Tolokonnikov was chosen to represent Russia at the 2015 World Championships in Beijing.

International competitions

References

External links
 European Athletics profile
 

1996 births
Living people
Russian male middle-distance runners
World Athletics Championships athletes for Russia
Russian Athletics Championships winners